Volkovija may refer to:
 Volkovija, Brvenica, North Macedonia
 Volkovija, Mavrovo and Rostuša, North Macedonia